Hannover Re (in German Hannover Rück) is a reinsurance company based in Hannover, Germany. It is the third-largest reinsurance group in the world, with a gross premium of around €33 billion. Founded in 1966, Hannover Re transacts all lines of property & casualty and life & health reinsurance and has a network of over 170 subsidiaries, branches and representative offices on all five continents with a total staff of more than 3,000. The Group's German business is written by the subsidiary E+S Rück.

History 
Hannover Re was founded on 6 June 1966.

In the 1970s, the company entered the US and Japanese markets. In 1981, the company made its first acquisition of a foreign insurance group – the Hollandia Group (now Hannover Re Group Africa). In 1990, the acquisition of Hamburger Internationale Rückversicherungs-AG followed.

In 1994, Hannover Re went public. In the same year, the company was the first reinsurer ever to securitise natural catastrophe risks for the capital market.

In 1996, Eisen und Stahl Rück was integrated into the Hannover Re Group. From then on, Hannover Re serves foreign insurance markets, while Eisen und Stahl Rück – now E+S Rück – takes responsibility for handling the German market.

As part of its increasingly international orientation, the legal form of the company was conversed to a Societas Europaea (European Company) in 2013. Hannover Re has since traded as Hannover Rück SE.

In 2019, Jean-Jacques Henchoz succeeded Ulrich Wallin as Chief Executive Officer of Hannover Re.

Structure 
Hannover Re transacts reinsurance in the business groups Property & Casualty and Life & Health.

Property & Casualty: Hannover Re offers a comprehensive range of products in treaty and facultative reinsurance as well as in the area of structured reinsurance solutions.

Life & Health: Hannover Re offers its customers worldwide reinsurance protection in all lines of life and health insurance. It supports clients with the financing of new business and financial optimisation and offers product partnerships for strategic market positioning.

Share and shareholder 
The majority shareholder of Hannover Re is Talanx AG with 50.2% of the voting rights. The remaining shares are held by institutional or private investors. Shareholders include investors who pay particularly close attention to sustainability criteria.

Leadership 
Members of the Executive Board:
Jean-Jacques Henchoz (CEO), Clemens Jungsthöfel (CFO), Sven Althoff (Property & Casualty reinsurance), Sharon Ooi (Property & Casualty reinsurance), Michael Pickel (Property & Casualty reinsurance), Silke Sehm (Property & Casualty reinsurance), Claude Chèvre (Life & Health reinsurance), Dr. Klaus Miller (Life & Health reinsurance)

Members of the Supervisory Board:
Torsten Leue (Chairman), Herbert K. Haas, Natalie Bani Ardalan, Frauke Heitmüller, Ilka Hundeshagen, Dr. Ursula Lipowsky, Dr. Michael Ollmann, Dr. Andrea Pollak, Dr. Erhard Schipporeit

Locations 

Africa: Abidjan, Johannesburg
The Americas: Bogotá, Charlotte, Denver, Hamilton, Itasca, Mexico City, New York, Orlando, Rio de Janeiro, Toronto
Asia: Hong Kong, Kuala Lumpur, Manama, Mumbai, Seoul, Shanghai, Taipei, Tokyo
Australia: Sydney
Europe: Dublin, Hannover, London, Madrid, Milan, Paris, Stockholm

Key figures

Key figures of Hannover Re 2016-2021:

Arts Promotion 
On occasion of its 25th anniversary in 1991, the Hannover Re Foundation was established for the benefit of the Sprengel Museum. The task of the foundation is to acquire contemporary works of art and make them available to the Sprengel Museum on permanent loan. In addition to the Sprengel Museum, Hannover Re supports other cultural institutions based in Hannover, such as the Wilhelm Busch Museum, the Kunstverein Hannover and the Kestnergesellschaft Hannover. Hannover Re also has its own art collection, which is continually expanded through purchases. Since 2014 there has also been an exhibition series entitled "Meisterschüler" (Master Students) in cooperation with the Braunschweig University of Fine Arts.

References

External links
 
 Hannover Re Bachelor Blog

Financial services companies established in 1966
Companies based in Hanover
Insurance companies of Germany
Reinsurance companies
German brands
1966 establishments in Germany
Companies in the MDAX